Hatgobindapur is a village in Burdwan II CD block in Bardhaman Sadar North subdivision of Purba Bardhaman district in the state of West Bengal, India.

Geography

Location

Urbanisation
73.58% of the population of Bardhaman Sadar North subdivision live in the rural areas. Only 26.42% of the population live in the urban areas, and that is the highest proportion of urban population amongst the four subdivisions in Purba Bardhaman district. The map alongside presents some of the notable locations in the subdivision. All places marked in the map are linked in the larger full screen map.

Demographics
As per the 2011 Census of India Hatgobindapur had a total population of 5,823, of which 2,933 (50%) were males and 2,890 (50%) were females. Population below 6 years was 533. The total number of literates in Hatgobindapur was 3,989 (75.41% of the population over 6 years).

Transport
The Bardhaman-Kalna Road passes through Hatgobindapur.

Education
Dr. Bhupendra Nath Dutta Smriti Mahavidyalaya was established at Hatgobindapur in 1996. It offers honours courses in Bengali, Sanskrit, English, history, political science, philosophy, geography, accountancy, mathematics, chemistry, botany, zoology and nutrition.

Culture
Panchanan’s fair is organised at Hatgobindapur in the Bengali month of Ashadha. The village has temples dedicated to Manasa, Sridhara and Durga.

David J. McCutchion mentions the Sridhara temple (18’8” façade) as a standard 17th century atchala temple with porch on triple archway and the Shiva temple (beside the main road) as a standard pancharatna temple with bridged rekha turrets and single entrance. The latter has predominantly vegetal/ floral design.

Healthcare
There is a primary health centre at Kashiara, PO Hatgobindapur (with 4 beds).

References

Villages in Purba Bardhaman district